Rembert Dodoens (born Rembert Van Joenckema, 29 June 1517 – 10 March 1585) was a Flemish physician and botanist, also known under his Latinized name Rembertus Dodonaeus. He has been called the father of botany.

Life 
Dodoens was born Rembert van Joenckema in Mechelen, then the capital of the Spanish Netherlands in 1517.  His parents were Denis van Joenckema (d. 1533) and Ursula Roelants. The van Joenckema family and name are Frisian in origin. Its members were active in politics and jurisprudence in Friesland and some had moved in 1516 to Mechelen. His father was one of the municipal physicians in Mechelen and a private physician to Margaret of Austria, Governor of the Netherlands, in her final illness. Margaret of Austria's court was based in Mechelen. Rembert later changed his last name to Dodoens (literally "Son of Dodo", a form of his father's name, Denis or Doede).

He was educated at the municipal college in Mechelen before beginning his studies in medicine, cosmography and geography at the age of 13 at the University of Leuven (Louvain), under Arnold Noot, Leonard Willemaer, Jean Heems, and Paul Roelswhere. He graduated with a licentiate in medicine in 1535, and as was the custom of the time, began extensive travels (Wanderjahren) in Europe till 1546, including Italy, Germany, and France. In 1539 he married Kathelijne De Bruyn (1517–1572), who came from a medical family in Mechelen. With her he had four children, Ursula (b. 1544), Denijs (b. 1548),  Antonia and Rembert Dodoens. He had a short stay in Basel (1542–1546). In 1557, Dodoens turned down a chair at the University of Leuven. He also turned down an offer to become court physician of king Philip II of Spain. After his wife's death at the age of 55 in 1572, he married Maria Saerinen by whom he had a daughter, Johanna. He died in Leiden in 1585, and was buried at Pieterskerk, Leiden.

After graduation, he followed in his father's footsteps by becoming in 1548 one of the three municipal physicians in Mechelen together with Joachim Roelandts and Jacob De Moor. He was the court physician of the Holy Roman emperor Maximilian II, and his successor, Austrian emperor Rudolph II in Vienna (1575–1578). In 1582, he was appointed professor in medicine at the University of Leiden.

State of botanical science in Dodoens' time
[[File:Cruijdeboeck, Deel 6, Cap. i, Van Roosen, Rembert Dodoens.jpg|thumb|180px|Title page of Part 6 of the Cruijdeboeck 1554]]

In the early sixteenth century the general belief was that the plant world had been completely described by Dioscorides in his De Materia Medica. During Dodoens' lifetime, botanical knowledge was undergoing enormous expansion, partly fueled by the expansion of the known plant world by New World exploration, the discovery of printing and the use of wood-block illustration. This period is thought of as a botanical Renaissance. Europe became fascinated with natural history from the 1530s, and gardening and cultivation of plants became a passion and prestigious pursuit from monarchs to universities. The first botanical gardens appeared as well as the first illustrated botanical encyclopaedias, together with thousands of watercolours and woodcuts. The experience of farmers, gardeners, foresters, apothecaries and physicians was being supplemented by the rise of the plant expert. Collecting became a discipline, specifically the Kunst- und Wunderkammern (cabinets of curiosities) outside of Italy and the study of naturalia became widespread through many social strata. The great botanists of the sixteenth century were all, like Dodoens, originally trained as physicians, who pursued a knowledge of plants not just for medicinal properties, but in their own right. Chairs in botany, within medical faculties were being established in European universities throughout the sixteenth century in reaction to this trend, and the scientific approach of observation, documentation and experimentation was being applied to the study of plants.

Otto Brunfels published his Herbarium in 1530, followed by those of Jerome Bock (1539) and Leonhard Fuchs (1542), men that Kurt Sprengel would later call the “German fathers of botany”. These men all influenced Dodoens, who was their successor.

 Publications 

Dodoens' initial works were published in the fields of cosmography and physiology. His De frugum historia (1552), a treatise on cereals, vegetables, and fodders  marked the beginning of a distinguished career in botany. His herbal Cruydeboeck (herb book) with 715 images (1554, 1563) was influenced by earlier German botanists, particularly that of Leonhart Fuchs. Of the drawings in the Cruydeboeck, 515 were borrowed from Leonhart Fuchs' New-Kreuterbüchlein (1543) while 200 new drawings were drawn by Pieter van der Borcht the Elder and the woodblocks cut by Arnold Nicolai.

Rather than the traditional method of arranging the plants in alphabetical order, the  Cruydeboeck divided the plant kingdom into six groups (Deel), based on their properties and affinities. It treated in detail especially the medicinal herbs, which made this work, in the eyes of many, a pharmacopoeia. This work and its various editions and translations became one of the most important botanical works of the late 16th century, part of its popularity being his use of the vernacular rather than the commonly used Latin.

The Cruydeboeck was translated first into French in 1557 by Charles de L'Ecluse (Histoire des Plantes), and into English (via L'Ecluse) in 1578 by Henry Lyte (A new herbal, or historie of plants), and later into Latin in 1583 (Stirpium historiae pemptades sex). The English version became a standard work in that language. In his times, it was the most translated book after the Bible. It became a work of worldwide renown, used as a reference book for two centuries.

The Cruydeboeck's latin version published at the Plantin Press in Antwerp in 1583 under the title Stirpium historiae pemptades sex sive libri XXXs was a considerable revision.  It contained new families, enlarged the number of groups from 6 to 26 and included many new illustrations, both original and borrowed. It was used by John Gerard as the source for his widely used Herball (1597). Thomas Johnson, in his preface to his 1633 edition of Herball, explains the controversial use of Dodoens' work by Gerard.  The Latin version was also translated back into Dutch and published in 1608 in Leiden by the Plantin Press of Frans van Ravelingen under the title Crvydt-Boeck van Robertus Dodonaeus, volgens sijne laatste verbetering... etc.  This edition included additional information on American plants prepared by Joost van Ravelingen, the brother of the publisher and a botanist and physician like Dodoens himself.  The Dutch editions of 1618 and 1644 were reprints of this 1608 edition.  The 1644 edition had 1492 pages and 1367 woodcuts.

 List of selected publications 

 see 

 
 
 
 (1584) De sphaera sive de astronomiae et geographiae principiis cosmographica isagoge. Antwerp (2nd ed.) 
 
 
 
 , also at Teylers Museum
 2nd ed. 1563
 
  2nd ed. 1576, see also Aboca Museum 
 
 
 

 Posthumous 

 Praxis medica (1616)
 Remberti Dodonaei Mechilensis ... stirpium historiae pemptades sex, sive libri XXX : varie ab Auctore, paullo ante Mortem, aucti & emendati. Antverpiae : Moretus / Plantin, 1616 Digital edition of the University and State Library Düsseldorf.
 Ars medica, ofte ghenees-kunst (1624)
 Cruydt-Boeck (1644) (13th, last and most comprehensive edition, 5th Flemish ed.)

 Works in translation 
 
 
 
 

 Eponomy 

The plant genus Dodonaea was named after Dodoens, by Carl Linnaeus. The following species are also named after him: Epilobium dodonaei,: Comocladia dodonaea, Phellandrium dodonaei, Smyrnium dodonaei, Hypericum dodonaei  and  Pelargonium dodonaei .

 Bibliography 

 Books and articles 

 
 
 
 
 
 
 
 
 
 Review. Margarita Winkel Newsletter: International Institute for Asian Studies 32. Autumn 2003
 
 
 

 Chapters 

 , in 
 , in 
 , in 
 , in 

External links

 
 
  	
 
  Bibliography''

Notes

References

External links

1517 births
1585 deaths
Physicians of the Habsburg Netherlands
Flemish botanists
Botanists with author abbreviations
Pre-Linnaean botanists
Scientists from Mechelen
Old University of Leuven alumni
Academic staff of Leiden University
Burials at Pieterskerk, Leiden
Scientists of the Spanish Netherlands
Physicians from Mechelen